Zurück is a retrospective enhanced EP by Norwegian band Serena Maneesh, recorded during the period from 1999 to 2003. It was released in 2005 by HoneyMilk Records. "Zurück" and "Sehnsucht" are German words respectively for "back" and "desire".

Track listing
"Introspection" – 4:49
"Leipziger Love" – 3:04
"Degenerate" – 3:02
"Sehnsucht" / Drag Me Upstairs  – 4:13
"Never  – 6:16"
"Drive Me Home the Lonely Nights" (promo video)  – 3:11 Enhanced
"Ich Bin Geil" – 0:69
"Ich Bin Ein Fettes Grossess Schwein"

Credits
Lina Holmström
Sondre Tristan Midttun
Eivind Schou
Håvard Krogedal
Morten Øby
Tommy Akerholdt
Emil Nikolaisen

Media links
Drive Me Home The Lonely Nights promo video

References

External links
Serena Maneesh@HoneyMilk Artist page (domestic label)

2005 EPs
Serena-Maneesh albums